Anne Searls De Groot is a physician, immunologist and entrepreneur. She is the co-founder and CEO/CSO of the immunoinformatics company EpiVax. Prior to EpiVax, she was a professor at Brown University, where she established the TB/HIV Research Lab. The laboratory attracted a range of intelligent and creative Brown University undergraduate and graduate students (Bill Jesdale, Gabriel Meister, Tamar Renaud, Jessica Stevens, and many others) who worked with De Groot on projects ranging from improving healthcare for inmates living in correctional facilities in the United States, improving access to care in West Africa, and developing cutting edge tools for analyzing protein sequences and designing vaccines.

While at Brown University, De Groot worked with Gabriel Meister and Bill Jesdale to develop the EpiMer and EpiMatrix epitope mapping tools. These were among the first motif-based and matrix-based, fully automated T cell epitope mapping tools. The team applied these tools to HIV vaccine design, and were soon travelling to HIV Vaccine conferences as a group to demonstrate how the tools could be used to help design vaccines that would be effective against a range of HIV strains (see GAIA Vaccine, and GAIA Vaccine Foundation). Additional tools were developed that automated genome sequence analysis for highly conserved, immunogenic epitopes, starting from any protein sequence.

Having successfully collaborated with a range of institutions, including University of Pennsylvania, Hopkins University, Harvard University, and the CDC, De Groot, working with then-consultant Bill Martin, decided to establish a commercial company to make these tools available to a wider audience. EpiVax was founded with an initial grant from the Slater Biotechnology Foundation (in 1998). During the 1998-2008 period, EpiVax became a well known for innovative, collaborative research in computational vaccinology and immunoinformatics.

De Groot was invited to establish a new Institute at the University of Rhode Island in 2008. She directed the Institute for Immunology and Informatics at the University of Rhode Island, from 2009 to 2019, and is currently Senior Scientist and Professor at the University of Georgia Center for Vaccines and Immunology. and the Clinica Esperanza (Hope Clinic). She is actively involved in graduate teaching at the Center for Vaccines and Immunology and guides the scientific research program in her laboratory at EpiVax.

Education 

De Groot graduated from Smith College in 1978 with a BA and from the Pritzker School of Medicine at University of Chicago in 1983 with an MD. She completed her residency in internal medicine at Tufts New England Medical Center and then trained in Parasitology and Vaccine Research at the NIH and in Infectious Disease at the Tufts New England Medical Center.

De Groot is board certified in Internal Medicine and Infectious Disease. She is the volunteer Medical Director and currently practices Internal Medicine at the Clinica Esperanza (Hope Clinic), a free clinic for Rhode Island residents who do not have health insurance.

Career 

De Groot and Bill Martin (COO/CIO EpiVax) founded EpiVax in 1998 to use bioinformatics to design epitope-driven vaccines and expanded to offer immunogenicity screening services for protein therapeutics.  De Groot, Martin and Dr. Leonard Moise discovered regulatory T cell epitopes, called “Tregitopes”, that are shown to activate regulatory T cells and suppress the immune response. De Groot, Martin and Moise also developed the JanusMatrix tool, that identifies regions of "immune camouflage" used by pathogens to escape immune response.

Between 1992 and 2008, De Groot also contributed to the Yale HIV in Prison program and Massachusetts Correctional Institution at Framingham, providing medical treatment to inmates, founded the GAIA Vaccine Foundation for improving global AIDS treatment, and founded a free clinic in Rhode Island, Clinica Esperanza. Her current work at the Clinica Esperanza includes the nurse-run CHEER Clinic, a walk in clinic pilot program that serves as an alternative to non-urgent ER visits.

Clinica Esperanza
Clinica Esperanza (Hope Clinic) is a volunteer-run free clinic for uninsured adults located in the Olneyville neighborhood of Providence, Rhode Island. It provides culturally-attuned and sensitive medical care to more than 9,000 patients since its founding in 2007, 80% of whom are native Spanish speakers.

References

https://web.archive.org/web/20131002102618/http://www.smith.edu/video/meet-medalist-anne-searls-de-groot
http://www.pbn.com/URI-names-EpiVax-founder-to-head-brInstitute-for-Immunology-Informatics,40257

External links
http://www.epivax.com/news/providence-business-news-profiles-dr-anne-de-groot/

University of Rhode Island faculty
Smith College alumni
Pritzker School of Medicine alumni
Tufts University School of Medicine alumni
American women chief executives
Living people
Year of birth missing (living people)
Brown University faculty
American women academics
21st-century American women